Dave Recher (born December 30, 1942) is a former American football center. He played for the Philadelphia Eagles from 1965 to 1968.

References

1942 births
Living people
Players of American football from Chicago
American football centers
Iowa Hawkeyes football players
Philadelphia Eagles players
People from Skokie, Illinois